The Bottsand-class oil recovery ships (Type 738) of the German Navy are intended for seawater pollution control. The twin hull ships feature a bow which can be opened by 65 degrees. The water is pumped into the ship's  tank, where it will be cleaned and the oil separated.

The two ships in the class entered service in 1984 and 1987. The ships are auxiliary ships of the navy. They are used to contain oil spills from German ships in the sea. They are manned by civilians and not naval personnel.

List of ships

References

Auxiliary ship classes
 Bottsand class oil recovery ship